Jérôme Colinet (born 26 April 1983 in Dinant) is a retired Belgian footballer and current head coach of RFC Seraing's U19 squad.

Biography
Colinet had played for Standard Liège in youth level before started his professional career at Roda JC, where he played a few matches at Eredivisie. In summer 2006, he signed a two-year contract with Paderborn of 2. Bundesliga. In May 2007, he terminated his contract in mutual consent. He then played for K.V. Mechelen in the Belgian First Division. He played four matches and left for Namur in January 2008.

He then played for Eupen in the Belgian Second Division.

Colinet had played at 2002 UEFA European Under-19 Championship qualifying and also played at 2006 UEFA European Under-21 Football Championship qualification.

Coaching career
In April 2017, Colinet joined RUW Ciney where he also would be a part of the coaching team. In October 2018, he decided to hang op his boots.

On 19 August 2019, Colinet was appointed U19 head coach of RFC Seraing alongside his role as provincial coordinator for Associations des Clubs Francophones de Football (ACFF).

References

External links
 
 Jérôme Colinet at vi.nl 
 

1983 births
Living people
People from Dinant
Belgian footballers
Belgium under-21 international footballers
Belgian expatriate footballers
Eredivisie players
Belgian Pro League players
Challenger Pro League players
2. Bundesliga players
Standard Liège players
Roda JC Kerkrade players
K.V. Mechelen players
K.A.S. Eupen players
Lommel S.K. players
Belgian expatriate sportspeople in the Netherlands
Belgian expatriate sportspeople in Germany
Expatriate footballers in the Netherlands
Expatriate footballers in Germany
Association football midfielders
Footballers from Namur (province)